Giorgio Blais (Turin, April 14, 1935) is a major-general of the Italian Army, risen to public notoriety for having crossed, on foot and alone during summer of 2000, Italy from Piedmont down to Sicily.

He started on June 16 from the top of Rocciamelone, and after a journey. of 1700 km he arrived on August 5 at the flank of Mount Etna. The goal of this enterprise, which he defined as "my reckless walk through Italy", was to bring a message of brotherhood and Italianness to the 42 stopover towns. For this endeavor, he has been appointed Grand Officer by the President of Italy Carlo Azeglio Ciampi on December 27, 2003.

Biography
During his career, he has served in the Brigades Taurinense, Cadore, Orobica, Julia as well as in the Central Offices in Rome. He has a military paratrooper's license and a 2nd degree civilian pilot's license.  He worked for about nine years in international missions in the Balkans, an area of which he claims expertise.

For four years he was Director of Military Studies at the International Institute of Humanitarian Law (1994–1998), and for 8 years (1999–2007) Vice-President of the same Institute. Between 2011 and 2014 he directed human rights and international humanitarian law courses for Iraqi and Kurdish government officials in Baghdad and Erbil (sponsored program of the Italian Ministry of Foreign Affairs). He was professor of "methodology of documentation" at the Italian Institute of Publicism (1977–1982).

Awards
Commander Order of Merit of the Italian Republic the December 27, 1986
Grand Officer Order of Merit of the Italian Republic the December 27, 2003

References

1935 births
Living people
Italian generals
Military personnel from Turin